The Tagiadini are a tribe of skipper butterflies in the family  Hesperiidae. Many of its genera were of uncertain relationships for long, and delimitation of the Tagiadini versus the Celaenorrhinini was quite disputed at times. The species of this tribe are found in mostly tropical regions of Africa, Asia and Australia.

Genera
Altogether, the tribe contains 27 genera. Some of these seem to form a close-knit group around the tribe's type genus Tagiades. These genera are often collectively called "Tagiades group" and may form a clade:

"Tagiades group"
 Abantis – paradise skippers
 Abaratha
 Ctenoptilum
 Leucochitonea
 Netrobalane – buff-tipped skipper
 Semperium
 Tagiades – water flats, snow flats
Other genera

 Abraximorpha
 Albiphasma
 Calleagris – scarce flats
 Capila (formerly often placed in Celaenorrhinini)
 Coladenia
 Daimio
 Darpa
 Eagris – "flats"
 Gerosis
 Mooreana
 Odina
 Pintara
 Procampta – rare elf
 Satarupa
 Seseria
 Tapena
 Triskelionia

References

  (2007): Tree of Life Web Project – Tagiadini. Version of 2007-DEC-12. Retrieved 2009-DEC-24.

 

Taxa named by Paul Mabille
Butterfly tribes